San Fabián is the easternmost of 21 communes in the Punilla Province of central Chile's. Ñuble Region. The capital is the town of San Fabián de Alico.

Administration
As a commune, San Fabián is administered by a municipal council, headed by a directly elected alcalde. For the years 2008-2012, the alcalde is Cristían Marcelo Fernández Gómez (Ind.), and the council members are:
 Juan Quiroga Navarrete (UDI)
 Héctor González Leiva (RN)
 Rodrigo Avila González (RN)
 Lorena Jardua Campos (RN)
 Ursito Quiñones Briones (PDC)
 Juan Carlos Acuña Acuña (PPD)

Within the electoral divisions of Chile, San Fabián is represented in the Chamber of Deputies as a part of the 42nd electoral district (together with Ñiquén, San Carlos, San Nicolás, Ninhue, Quirihue, Cobquecura, Treguaco, Portezuelo, Coelemu, Ránquil, Quillón, Bulnes, Cabrero, Yumbel). The commune is represented in the Senate as part of the 12th senatorial constituency (Biobío Cordillera).

Demographics
According to data from the 2002 Census of Population and Housing, the San Fabián commune had 3,646 inhabitants; of these, 1,452 (39.8%) lived in urban areas and 2,194 (60.2%) in rural areas, and there were 1,877 (51.5%) men and 1,769 (48.5%) women. The communal population fell 4.1% (157 persons) between the censuses of 1992 and 2002.

References

External links
  Municipality of San Fabián

Communes of Chile
Populated places in Punilla Province
1865 establishments in Chile

pt:San Fabián